Lieutenant General Robert R. Allardice (born c. 1958) is a retired United States Air Force officer who last served as the vice commander of Air Mobility Command from September 2011 to September 2013. Prior to that, he served as the commanding general of 18th Air Force from August 2009 to September 2011.

Allardice entered the Air Force in 1980 as a graduate of the U.S. Air Force Academy, earning a Bachelor of Science degree in civil engineering. He has commanded at the squadron, group, wing, and numbered air force level.

Allardice is a command pilot with more than 5,000 hours in the C-141, C-5, C-17, KC-135 and C-21.

Education
1980 Bachelor of Science degree in civil engineering, U.S. Air Force Academy, Colorado Springs, Colorado 
1985 Squadron Officer School, Maxwell AFB, Alabama 
1987 Master's degree in systems management, University of Southern California, Los Angeles, California
1993 Air Command and Staff College, Maxwell AFB, Alabama 
1998 Air War College, Maxwell AFB, Alabama 
2003 Senior Executive Fellowship, John F. Kennedy School of Government, Harvard University, Cambridge, Massachusetts 
2006 Program for Senior Managers in Government, John F. Kennedy School of Government, Harvard University, Cambridge, Massachusetts

Military assignments
 September 1980 – August 1981, student, undergraduate pilot training, Williams AFB, Arizona 
 September 1981 – September 1986, instructor pilot and flight examiner, 86th Military Airlift Squadron, Travis AFB, California
 October 1986 – September 1987, Air Staff Training officer, Deputy Chief of Staff for Plans and Operations, Headquarters U.S. Air Force, Washington, D.C. 
 October 1987 – August 1990, instructor pilot and flight examiner, 57th Military Airlift Squadron, Altus AFB, Oklahoma 
 September 1990 – July 1992, joint training and operations officer, director of operations, Headquarters U.S. European Command, Stuttgart-Vaihingen, Germany
 August 1992 – June 1993, student, Air Command and Staff College, Maxwell AFB, Alabama
 July 1993 – September 1993, student, Armed Forces Staff College, Norfolk, Virginia 
 October 1993 – June 1997, chief of safety, 436th Airlift Wing, and commander of 9th Airlift Squadron, Dover AFB, Delaware
 July 1997 – May 1998, student, Air War College, Maxwell AFB, Alabama 
 June 1998 – October 1998, chief of War and Mobilization Plans Division, Directorate of Operations and Training, Deputy Chief of Staff for Air and Space Operations, Headquarters U.S. Air Force, Washington, D.C. 
 October 1998 – May 2000, chief of Expeditionary Air Force Implementation Division, Directorate of EAF Implementation, Deputy Chief of Staff for Air and Space Operations, Headquarters U.S. Air Force, Washington, D.C. 
 May 2000 – June 2002, commander of 437th Operations Group, Charleston AFB, South Carolina 
 June 2002 – June 2004, commander of 62nd Airlift Wing, McChord AFB, Washington 
 June 2004 – October 2005, director of personnel, Headquarters Air Force Materiel Command, Wright-Patterson AFB, Ohio 
 October 2005 – March 2007, director of airman development and sustainment, Deputy Chief of Staff for Manpower and Personnel, Headquarters U.S. Air Force, Washington, D.C. 
 March 2007 – March 2008, commander of Coalition Air Force Transition Team, Baghdad, Iraq
 April 2008 – July 2009, director for strategy, plans and policy, Headquarters U.S. Central Command, MacDill AFB, Florida
 August 2009 – September 2011, commander of 18th Air Force, Scott AFB, Illinois 
 September 2011 – present, vice commander of Air Mobility Command, Scott AFB, Illinois

Effective dates of promotion

Post-military career
Allardice is employed as a senior mentor for the Joint Staff, J7, in support of Combatant Command and Joint Task Force Operations and Exercises. He also serves as a Senior Fellow in support of the National Defense University’s Pinnacle, Capstone, and Keystone programs, which are designed to train newly selected generals and admirals to be more effective in joint and multinational operations.

Allardice is also a member of the Air Force Studies Board of the National Academies’ National Research Council, “Opportunities for the Employment of Simulation in U.S. Air Force Training Environments.”

Allardice founded Allardice™ Enterprises, Inc., in 2013 after serving in the United States Air Force for over 33 years.

References 

Living people
Recipients of the Legion of Merit
United States Air Force generals
Year of birth missing (living people)